The following lists events that happened during 2006 in the Central African Republic.

Incumbents
President: François Bozizé 
Prime Minister: Élie Doté

Events

June
 June 27 - Chadian rebels attack the neighboring Central African Republic. They have reportedly formed an alliance with CAR rebels. Large areas of both countries have descended into violence.

July
 July 3 - United Nations Secretary General Kofi Annan issues a report warning that ongoing fighting in Chad, Sudan, the Central African Republic, and Cameroon are increasingly destabilized and that borders are loosely enforced.

November
 November 10 - Rebels claim to have captured a second town in the Central African Republic during a two-week-long offensive.
 November 17 - Chad has offered to send troops to the Central African Republic to help fight rebels it claims are backed by Sudan.
 November 28 - French forces have clashed with rebels in the Central African Republic during a government offensive to regain control of the northern town of Birao.
 November 30 - French fighter planes have fired at rebels in northern Central African Republic where thousands have fled fighting in recent weeks.

References

 
Years of the 21st century in the Central African Republic
2000s in the Central African Republic
Central African Republic
Central African Republic